A Joyful Noise is a live album by American gospel singing group The Drinkard Singers, released in the U.S. in 1958 on RCA Records. It is a live recording of gospel tunes performed by the family act which comprised Emily Drinkard (later known as Cissy Houston), her sisters Anne Moss, Lee Warrick (mother of Dionne Warwick and Dee Dee Warwick), and brothers Nickolas and Larry Drinkard and Marie Epps. Anne Drinkard left and was replaced by Lee's adopted daughter Judy Guions, who was later known as Judy Clay.

Notes
After the Drinkard Singers appearance at the 1957 Newport Jazz Festival, they recorded the first gospel album to appear on a major label, which would become the live album, A Joyful Noise for RCA Records in 1958.

Track listing
U.S. LP Album
A Side
"My Rock" - 2:39
"Use Me, Lord" - 2:45
"Rise, Shine" - 3:10
"One Day" - 3:06
"Listen to the Lambs" - 3:11
"After It's All Over" - 2:39

B Side
"Somebody Touched Me" - 2:49
"Wade in the Water" - 2:23
"Just a Little While to Stay Here" - 2:58
"Singing In My Soul" - 2:52
"Ring Those Golden Bells - 2:35
"Sweet Hour of Prayer" (William B. Bradbury, William W. Walford) - 3:11

Personnel
Ann Moss, Judy Clay, Larry Drinkard, Lee Warrick, Marie Epps, Emily Drinkard Garland - vocals
Nicky Drinkard - vocals, piano
Teddy Jones - bass (Track 2)
Moe Harper - drums
Dicky Mitchell - organ
John Johnson Jr (tracks: A2, A4 to A6, B1, B2, B4, B5), Kelly Owens (tracks: A1, A3, B3, B6) - piano (uncredited)
Unknown Artist (tracks: B1) - tambourine (uncredited)
Technical
Brad McCuen - producer
Ray Hall - engineer
Murray Laden - photography

References

External links
The Drinkard Singers Bio
Cissy Houston

1958 albums
The Drinkard Singers albums
RCA Records albums